Mount Herschel is a conspicuous peak standing  northeast of Mount Peacock and overlooking the terminus of Ironside Glacier from the south, in the Admiralty Mountains, Victoria Land, Antarctica.

The peak was discovered in 1841 by Sir James Clark Ross, who named this feature for Sir John F.W. Herschel, noted English astronomer.

References

Admiralty Mountains
Mountains of Victoria Land
Borchgrevink Coast